Bhilarwadi is a village in the Karmala taluka of Solapur district in Maharashtra state, India.

Demographics
Covering  and comprising 327 households at the time of the 2011 census of India, Bhilarwadi had a population of 1593. There were 839 males and 754 females, with 233 people being aged six or younger.

References

Villages in Karmala taluka